The Alberta Pandas will represent the University of Alberta in the 2009-10 Canadian Interuniversity Sport women's hockey season. The Pandas won the Canadian Interuniversity Sport women's ice hockey championship. In the championship, they defeated the McGill Martlets by a score of 2-0

Regular season
November 7: By defeating the University of British Columbia Thunderbirds by a score of 3–2, the Pandas became the first women's hockey team in Canada West to hit double digits in the win column this season. The 2008–09 Canada West Rookie of the Year, and first star of the game, Stephanie Ramsay, scored the first goal of the game. She received the feed from sophomore forward Sarah Hilworth (the game's third star) at the 7:16 mark of the first. Having five assists through her first six games, Tamara Pickford scored 30 seconds into the second period.
 November 14: The #3-ranked University of Alberta Pandas earned a 3–0 win over the University of Lethbridge Pronghorns, Saturday night at Clare Drake Arena in Edmonton.

Standings
In Canada West, an overtime loss is worth 1 point

The top four teams qualify for the playoffs

Roster

Schedule

Player stats

Skaters

Goaltenders

Postseason
The Alberta Pandas defeated the McGill Martlets to claim the 2010 Canadian Interuniversity Championship. The Pandas ended the Martlets historic 86-game unbeaten streak against CIS opponents. Said streak dated back to December 30 of 2007. It was the Pandas who also beat the Martlets back on that date. Alberta had notched a 2-1 shootout victory. With the win, the Pandas also snapped the Martlets 20 game unbeaten streak in the postseason. This streak is also linked to the Alberta Pandas who claimed a 4-0 win in the 2007 CIS gold medal game. In the 2010 Championship Game, Melody Howard's unassisted goal at 6:09 in the first period held up as the game-winning goal. Forward Alana Cabana scored the second goal of the game.

CIS Tournament

Awards and honors
CIS Tournament championship player of the game: Jennifer Jubb (Alberta Pandas)
CIS Tournament MVP: Stephanie Ramsay, Alberta
CIS Tournament All-Stars
 Goaltender: Dana Vinge, Alberta
Defense: Stephanie Ramsay, Alberta
Forward: Leah Copeland, Alberta

See also
2007–08 Alberta Pandas women's ice hockey season

References

External links
 University of Alberta Athletics

Alberta
Alberta Pandas women's ice hockey
Alberta